Daire Connery (born 2000) is an Irish hurler who plays for Premier Senior Championship club Na Piarsaigh and at inter-county level with the Cork senior hurling team. He usually lines out as a left wing-forward.

Playing career

Na Piarsaigh

Son of Christy Connery, a stalwart of the Na Piarsaigh club on the northside of Cork city, Connery first played hurling at juvenile and underage levels with the same club. He was a member of the half-back line when the club's minor team defeated Killeagh-St. Ita's by 5-09 to 0-10 to win the Cork Premier 1 MHC title in 2016.

On 29 April 2018, Connery made his debut with the Na Piarsaigh senior team in a 2-15 to 0-15 defeat by Bandon in the 2018 Cork County Championship.

Cork

Under-17 and minor

Connery first lined out for Cork as a member of the under-17 team during the 2017 Munster Championship. He made his first appearance at right corner-back on 11 April in a 0-16 to 0-06 defeat of Limerick. On 25 April, Connery scored four points and claimed the Munster Championship title after a 3-13 to 1-12 defeat of Waterford in the final. He was again included on the starting fifteen, this time at midfield, for Cork's 1-19 to 1-17 All-Ireland final defeat of Dublin on 6 August.

As well as being a member of the Cork under-17 team in 2017, Connery was also in his second year as a member of the Cork minor team. On 9 July, he was at midfield when Cork defeated Clare by 4-21 to 0-16 to win the Munster Championship for the first time since 2008. On 3 September, Connery was again at midfield when Cork suffered a 2-17 to 2-15 All-Ireland final defeat by Galway.

Under-21 and under-20

Connery was still just 18-years-old when he was drafted onto the Cork under-21 team. He won a Munster Championship medal on 4 July 2018, after coming on as a substitute in Cork's 2-23 to 1-13 defeat of Tipperary in the final. On 26 August 2018, Connery was an unused substitute in Cork's 3-13 to 1-16 All-Ireland final defeat by Tipperary.

On 3 July 2019, Connery made his first appearance for Cork's inaugural under-20 team in the Munster Championship. He scored three points, including a sideline cut, in the 1-20 to 0-16 defeat of Limerick. On 23 July 2019, Connery was again at midfield when Cork suffered a 3-15 to 2-17 defeat by Tipperary in the Munster final. He was selected at left wing-forward when Cork faced Tipperary for a second time that year in the All-Ireland final on 24 August 2019. Connery ended the game on the losing side after a 5-17 to 1-18 defeat.

Senior

Connery was brought onto the Cork senior panel during the 2020 National League. He made the match-day panel for the first time for Cork's group stage game against Limerick on 23 February 2020. Connery was later included on Cork's Munster Championship panel and made his debut as a late replacement at left wing-forward for Aidan Walsh in a 1-28 to 1-24 defeat by Waterford.

Career statistics

Inter-county

Honours

Na Piarsaigh
Cork Premier 1 Minor Hurling Championship (1): 2016

Cork
All-Ireland Under-20 Hurling Championship (1): 2020
Munster Under-21 Hurling Championship (1): 2018
Munster Under-20 Hurling Championship (1): 2020
Munster Minor Hurling Championship (1): 2017
All-Ireland Under-17 Hurling Championship (1): 2017
Munster Under-17 Hurling Championship (1): 2017

References

2000 births
Living people
Na Piarsaigh hurlers
Cork inter-county hurlers